The Amritsar Mail is a train operated by Indian Railways which connects the eastern Indian city of Kolkata, and with it the Kolkata metropolitan area, with the northern Indian city of Amritsar. The train operates as service 13005 from Howrah Junction railway station to Amritsar Junction railway station, and service 13006 on the return journey.

See also
 Punjab Mail

References

External links
 Indian Railway Schedules

Transport in Amritsar
Rail transport in Howrah
Rail transport in Punjab, India
Rail transport in Uttar Pradesh
Rail transport in West Bengal
Rail transport in Haryana
Rail transport in Jharkhand
Rail transport in Bihar
Mail trains in India